Harry Diamond may refer to:

Harry Diamond (politician) (1908–1996), Irish politician
Harry Diamond (engineer) (1900–1948), American radio pioneer and inventor
Harry Diamond (photographer) (1924–2009), London photographer

See also
Harry Diamond Laboratories, a research facility of the National Bureau of Standards and later the U.S. Army